Jonas Christer Wessel (born 15 May 1943) is a Swedish curler.

He is a 1969 Swedish men's curling champion and a 1968 Swedish mixed curling champion.

Teams

Men's

Mixed

References

External links
 
 The Giant Feat in Canada, the Greateast Moment for the 60th Anniversary of Djursholms Curling Club

Living people
1943 births
Swedish male curlers
Swedish curling champions